Jesper Hansen  (born 19 November 1980 in Bjergsted) is a Danish sport shooter. At the 2012 Summer Olympics he competed in the Men's skeet, finishing in 26th place.  In 2013, he won the skeet shooting world championship.

At the 2020 Summer Olympics in Tokyo, Hansen won a silver medal.

References

1980 births
Living people
Danish male sport shooters
European Games competitors for Denmark
Medalists at the 2020 Summer Olympics
Olympic medalists in shooting
Olympic shooters of Denmark
Olympic silver medalists for Denmark
Shooters at the 2012 Summer Olympics
Shooters at the 2016 Summer Olympics
Shooters at the 2015 European Games
Shooters at the 2019 European Games
Shooters at the 2020 Summer Olympics